Albert of Mecklenburg  may refer to:

 Albert I, Duke of Mecklenburg-Stargard (bef. 1377–1397)
 Albert II, Duke of Mecklenburg (1318–1379)
 Albert III, Duke of Mecklenburg, better known as Albert, King of Sweden (1338–1412)
 Albert IV, Duke of Mecklenburg (bef. 1363–1388)
 Albert V, Duke of Mecklenburg (1397–1423) 
 Albert VI, Duke of Mecklenburg (1438–bef.1483)
 Albrecht VII, Duke of Mecklenburg (1486–1547)
 Albert VIII, Duke of Mecklenburg, better known as Albrecht von Wallenstein (1583–1634)
 John Albert I, Duke of Mecklenburg (1525–1576)
 John Albert II, Duke of Mecklenburg (1590–1636)
 Duke John Albert of Mecklenburg (1857–1920)